Henry Hayward may refer to:
 Henry Rudge Hayward (1831–1912), British priest, Archdeacon of Cheltenham
 Henry John Hayward (1865–1945), New Zealand theatre and cinema proprietor